Xiexiemaster or simply Xiexie is a strong xiangqi (Chinese chess) program created by Pascal Tang in 1998. At the beginning, as the program was located in France, it was very hard to find Chinese chess high class players. Finally, some European top players accepted to challenge the software (Hua Say Ty, Woo Wei Cheung, Dang Thanh Trung). The author was so grateful that he called the program "Xiexie" which comes from the same Chinese word which means "Thank you". 
"Eugenio Castillo has joined the Xiexie development team in 1999. Before 2001, there were a few Chinese chess programs and they were fairly mediocre. The program Xiexie became famous by beating the Chinese delegation of Chinese chess international Masters and Grand Masters in 2001 (Lu Qin, Jin Hai Ying ...) who came for a show in Paris. This victory marked the beginning of the recognition of Chinese chess software by top players. 

Since then, the evaluation function was further improved by Pascal Tang. From 2005, Jih-tung Pai added support of a DTC (Distance To Conversion) Endgame Tablebase. Thanks to Jih-tung Pai, Xiexie had the largest Chinese chess endgame tablebase of the World (350 GB).

Rewards 
Xiexiemaster won tournaments on the internet (on site www.clubxianqi.com example with pseudo Patang or www.movesky.net between 2000 and 2005).

Xiexiemaster was several time medalist at the Computer Olympiads.(Silver medal in 2016).

Xiexiemaster finally won the World Championship of Computer Chinese chess in 2004 in Tainan (Taipei). Nowadays, Xiexie is still a reference in the programming world of Chinese chess.

External links 
 Official site of Xiexie
 Online Chinese chess game server
 Online Chinese chess game server

Chess software
Xiangqi